Ibrahim Khan (born 13 April 1964) is a Pakistani former cricketer. He played two first-class matches for Rawalpindi in 1985/86.

See also
 List of Hyderabad cricketers

References

External links
 

1964 births
Living people
Pakistani cricketers
Rawalpindi cricketers
Cricketers from Karachi